MLS, or Major League Soccer, is a men's professional soccer league in the United States and Canada.

MLS may also refer to:

Academic degrees
 Master of Arts in Liberal Studies or Master of Liberal Studies
 Master of Library and Information Science or Master of Library Science, US and Canada
 Master of Studies in Law or Master of Legal Studies

Computer technology
 Maximum length sequence, a type of pseudorandom binary sequence
 MLS (Making Life Simple) S.A., a Greek software and telecommunications company
 Messaging Layer Security, encryption protocol
 Mozilla Location Service, a geolocation service
 Multilayer switch, in computer networking 
 Multilevel security

Other
 Maritime Launch Services, a Canadian space transport services company
 Martin-Luther-Schule, a secondary school
 Medical laboratory scientist
 Michigan Lutheran Seminary
 Microwave landing system, a radio guidance system
 Microwave limb sounders, measuring microwave emission from Earth's upper atmosphere
 Multi-layer steel, a type of automotive head gasket
 Multiple listing service of real estate brokers